"Talk Talk" is the debut single of American garage rock band The Music Machine. It was released in November 1966, and produced the band's only Top 20 hit on the Billboard Hot 100. The song was included on their debut album, (Turn On) The Music Machine.

Background

The Music Machine was practicing the song before any interest from record producers. Sean Bonniwell strived to perfect the sound he had been experimenting with in preparation for a record deal. The band regularly played at an American Legion bowling alley in Los Angeles. Bonniwell was originally involved in the folk rock scene, but he wanted to create a harder sound or as he stated "something completely unique". To create his designed sound, Bonniwell had the band tune their instruments from the typical E to Eb, creating a heavy effect (a technique later used by such Heavy Metal bands as Metallica). Bassist, Keith Olsen, utilized a fuzz box to produce the song's signature bassline, which was backed by Mark Landon's wiry guitar playing. This new way of playing caught the attention of record producer Brian Ross, who brought them into studios to record a single.

Recording in RCA Recording Studios took only three hours at the expense of US$150. The song took two takes and the planned A-side, "Come on In", in only one. "Come on In" was later replaced by "Talk Talk" when record producers deemed it suitable for an A-side release. The "Talk Talk" track clocked at one minute and 56 seconds, yet still compiled four distinctive rhythm changes. Engineer, Paul Buff, innovated the recording by using a ten-track recording machine when most recording artists only had a four-track. Keyboardist, Doug Rhodes, played the farfisa organ, which had its sound sliced and separated numerous times. The Music Machine was soon signed to the Original Sound label to release the single. "Talk Talk" became a hit upon its release when it eventually charted at number 15 on the national charts, remaining on the charts for 12 weeks, and also reached top ten in several L.A. charts. A.M. Radio constantly played the song due to its short track length, giving it added exposure. While touring, the song became a favorite among the band's fans, so the composition was regularly extended. The track was subsequently released on December 31, 1966 as the opening to the group's debut album, (Turn On) The Music Machine.

Releases
"Talk Talk" has been circulated through several albums, compilations, and reissues since its initial release.

Singles/EPs
 "Talk Talk" b/w "Come on In" – Original Sound, 1966
 "Talk Talk" / "The People In Me" / "Come on In" / "Wrong" EP – Disques Voque, 1966
 "Come on In" b/w "Talk Talk" – Alvorada International, 1967
 "Talk Talk" b/w "Hot Smoke and Sassafras" – Original Sound, 1985

Albums/compilations
 (Turn On) The Music Machine – Original Sound, 1966 (1st track)
 Best of the Music Machine – Rhino, 1984 (1st track)
 Beyond the Garage – Sundazed, 1995 (1st track)
 The Very Best of the Music Machine – Collectables, 1999 (1st track)
 The Ultimate Turn On – Big Beat, 2006 (1st track)

Reception
Aside from the initial chart success of the song, "Talk Talk" is still praised as a garage rock classic. Richie Unterberger praised Bonniwell's composition for its experimentation and raw sound. Unterberger described the song as "the most radical single to be heard on Top 40 radio in late 1966. Against a succession of grinding two-note fuzz riffs and key changes that rose and Rose until it hit the ceiling, Bonniwell sprewed and growled a rally cry to social alienation with a mixture of sarcasm, self-pity, and paranoia".

David Fricke of Rolling Stone was equally satisfied with the band's song. He declared the band "created a breathlessly compact garage rock: hog-snort guitar distortion, machine gun drumming and paranoid growling despair, shaved and hardened by geometric precision. And although he was in his mid-twenties, Bonniwell nailed in his lyrics the hapless rage of white high school males with similar rigor".

Personnel
 Sean Bonniwell – lead vocals
 Mark Landon – lead guitar
 Keith Olsen – bass
 Ron Edgar – drums
 Doug Rhodes – keyboards

Cover versions
 The Residents recorded a parody of the song in 1974, for their The Third Reich 'n Roll album.
 Prong's 1992 release Whose Fist Is This Anyway? includes a cover of the song.
 Webb Wilder released this song on his 1995 album of cover songs Town & Country.
 The Demics released a completely punk version of the song on their 1996 album, New York City.
 Boss Hog covered the song on the Psychopticotic Vol. One EP released by Amphetamine Reptile Records in 2016.
 Alice Cooper released this song as the opening track on his 1980 album Flush the Fashion.

See also
 List of 1960s one-hit wonders in the United States

References

External links

The Music Machine songs
1966 songs
1966 singles
Songs written by Sean Bonniwell
1966 debut singles